The Sodol is a left tributary of the river Bârzava in Romania. It discharges into the Bârzava in the city Reșița.

References

Rivers of Romania
Rivers of Caraș-Severin County